Coleophora aervae is a moth of the family Coleophoridae that is endemic to Iran.

The larvae feed on the leaves of Aerva persica.

References

External links

aervae
Moths of Asia
Endemic fauna of Iran
Moths described in 1994